Cool Planet is the 22nd album by Ohio-based group, Guided by Voices.
It was the final album by the band before their 2016 reformation. It was released in the United States on May 13, 2014, on the band's own label, Guided by Voices Inc. It was released in the UK a few days later, May 19, on Fire Records.

Track listing

Charts

References

2014 albums
Guided by Voices albums
Fire Records (UK) albums